Priscosturion is a genus of sturgeon from the Judith River Formation. It lived during the Campanian stage of the Late Cretaceous some 77.5 million years ago. Initially called Psammorhynchus, its describers Lance Grande and Eric J. Hilton renamed the animal in 2009. The fish belongs to the subfamily Priscosturioninae within the larger family Acipenseridae. Priscosturion is only known from one species, P. longipinnis.

Description
Its type specimen is rather complete. It is notable for its rather robust vertebrae.

References

 
Late Cretaceous fish of North America
Prehistoric ray-finned fish genera
Fossil taxa described in 2009